Anthology is a 31-track collection of songs that Steve Alaimo recorded during the sixties and seventies.

Track listing
 "Love's Gonna Live Here" - (Buck Owens) - 1:57
 "I Don't Know" - (Lloyd Campbell) - 2:31
 "Happy" - (Ray Stevens) - 2:23
 "Everybody Knows But Her" - (John R. Adkins) - 2:31
 "Real Live Girl" - (Cy Coleman, Carolyn Leigh) - 2:21
 "Cast Your Fate to the Wind" - (Vince Guaraldi) - 2:18
 "Mais Oui" - (Mann Curtis, Carlo Donida, Pinchi) - 2:43
 "The Lady of the House" - (Boudleaux Bryant, Felice Bryant) - 2:44
 "Blowin' in the Wind" - (Bob Dylan) - 2:37
 "So Much Love" - (Gerry Goffin, Carole King) - 2:50
 "Pardon Me (It's My First Day Alone)" - (Steve Barri, P.F. Sloan) - 2:52
 "You Don't Know Like I Know" - (Isaac Hayes, David Porter) - 2:05
 "Ooh Poo Pah Doo" - (Jessie Hill) - 2:23
 "New Orleans" - (Frank Guida, Joseph Royster) - 2:06
 "Denver" - (Spooner Oldham, Dan Penn) - 2:58
 "Watching the Trains Go By" - (Spooner Oldham, Dan Penn) - 2:43
 "Thank You for the Sunshine" - (Jackie Avery, Valenia Frazier) - 2:30
 "I'm Thankful" (duet with Betty Wright) - (Steve Alaimo, J.W. Alexander, Sam Cooke, Virginia Frazier) - 2:00
 "After the Smoke Is Gone" (duet with Betty Wright) - (William Clarke, Clarence Reid) - 2:37
 "Cry Myself to Sleep" - (Bob Crewe, Bob Gaudio) - 2:42
 "Every Day I Have to Cry" - (Arthur Alexander) - 2:22
 "A Lifetime of Loneliness" - (Burt Bacharach, Hal David) - 2:24
 "Don't Let the Sun Catch You Crying" - (Churchill, Joe Greene, Kojlman) - 2:43
 "Can't You See" - (Mickey Newbury) - 2:39
 "The Wild Side of Life" - (Arlie Carter, William Warren) - 2:11
 "When My Little Girl Is Smiling" - (Gerry Goffin, Carole King) - 2:31
 "Nobody's Fool" - (Bobby Emmons, Dan Penn) - 2:51
 "Amerikan Music" - (John Warren Carlton, Harold Wayne White) - 4:18
 "Sand in My Pocket" - (Wes Ferrell, Ian Levine, Toni Wine) - 2:09
 "She's My Baby" - (Steve Alaimo) - 2:32
 "Bright Lights, Big City" - (Jimmy Reed) - 2:06

1997 compilation albums
Steve Alaimo albums